is a former Japanese football player and current manager of Tochigi Uva FC.

Club statistics

References

External links

1977 births
Living people
Takushoku University alumni
Association football people from Saitama Prefecture
Japanese footballers
J2 League players
Japan Football League players
Thespakusatsu Gunma players
Association football forwards